Clavariadelphus pistillaris is a rare species of mushroom of the family Gomphaceae native to Europe and North America.
It grows during summer and autumn almost exclusively in beech forest on calcareous soil on litter and woodchips.

The mat and wrinkled fruiting body has the shape of a club with a rounded top. Its length varies between 10 cm and 30 cm and its width between 1 cm and 5 cm. The skin is red brown to ocher red, sometimes cinnamon brown with a lilac tint, turning brown when damaged. The spongy flesh is white. The spore print is pale yellow. It has a weak, but pleasant scent.

Through its appearance it could be mistaken for Clavariadelphus truncatus, a species found in coniferous mountainous forests.

The western North American variety is known as C. occidentalis.

Edibility 
The species is recorded as being edible. There have been reports of the mushroom being a "nutraceutical and/or functional food" due to its high antioxidant activity and containing essential fatty acids.

According to one field guide, the americana variety of the species usually does not have enough flesh to make it worthwhile to eat.

References

Further reading
 
 

Edible fungi
Fungi of Europe
Fungi of North America
Fungi described in 1933
Taxa named by Carl Linnaeus